Ginny or Ginnie is an English feminine given name or diminutive, frequently of Virginia.

People

Virginia
Ginny Arnell (born 1942), American singer and songwriter born Virginia Mazarro
Ginny Blackmore (born 1986), New Zealand singer and songwriter
Ginny Brown-Waite (born 1943), American politician
Ginny Burdick (born 1947), American politician
Ginnie Crawford (born 1983), American sprinter
Ginny Duenkel (born 1947), American former swimmer and 1964 Olympic champion
Ginny Fiennes (1947-2004), British explorer and wife of adventurer Ranulph Fiennes
Virginia Gilder (born 1958), American former rower
Virginia Grayson (born 1967), New Zealand-born Australian artist
Virginia Leng (born 1955), British equestrienne
Virginia "Ginny" Montes (1943–1994), civil rights activist and feminist
Ginny Owens (born 1975), contemporary Christian music singer
Ginny Simms (1913-1994), American singer and actress
Ginny Stikeman, Canadian filmmaker, director, producer and editor
Ginny Tyler (1925-2012), American voice actress
Ginnie Wade (1843-1863), only direct civilian fatality of the Battle of Gettysburg 
Ginny Wood (1917–2013), American environmental activist
Ginny Wright (born in the 1930s), American country music singer

Ginny
Ginny Buckley, British television presenter
Ginny Capicchioni, American lacrosse goaltender and coach, first woman to play in a men's professional lacrosse game
Ginny Fields (born 1945), American politician

Fictional characters
Ginny Gordon, protagonist of a series of mystery novels for adolescent girls
Ginny Sacramoni, wife of mob boss John "Johnny Sack" Sacramoni in the television series The Sopranos
Ginny Weasley, sister of Ron Weasley, girlfriend then wife of Harry Potter in the Harry Potter books by J. K. Rowling
Ginny, one of the four protagonists in SuperKitties

Other
Hurricane Ginny, in the 1963 Atlantic hurricane season
"Ginnie", a generator used to power a secret radio by British prisoners of war in the Batu Lintang camp during the Second World War
Ingenuity, a NASA helicopter nicknamed Ginny

See also
"Ginny, Ginny", a 1979 single by the rock band Slade
1983 Ginny Championships and 1984 Ginny Championships, Virginia Slims indoor tennis tournaments
Jinny, a list of people with the given name
Jinny (band), an Italian band
Ginny & Georgia, television series (2021)

References

Feminine given names
Lists of people by nickname
English feminine given names
English-language feminine given names